Guthrie is a village in Angus, Scotland, roughly at the centre point of the towns of Arbroath, Brechin and Forfar. The principal building in the village is Guthrie Castle, which has its own public golf course and is a popular venue for events such as markets, parties and weddings. The village of Guthrie is centered on the Guthrie parish church, containing the  Guthrie Aisle, built in 1450.

References

Villages in Angus, Scotland